Bogatyr Ridge (Hitokappu-san) is a stratovolcano located in the central part of Iturup Island, Kuril Islands, Russia. The highest peak of the ridge is Stokap which is also the highest peak of the island.

See also
 List of volcanoes in Russia
 List of ultras of Northeast Asia

References

Sources

External links 
 Hitokappu Volcano Group (Stokap) - Geological Survey of Japan

Iturup
Stratovolcanoes of Russia
Ridges of Asia
Volcanoes of the Kuril Islands